Bogue Culley is a stream in the U.S. state of Mississippi.

Bogue Culley is a name derived from either the Choctaw language or Chickasaw language and it most likely means "spring creek". A variant name is "Bogue Gulley".

References

Rivers of Mississippi
Rivers of Chickasaw County, Mississippi
Rivers of Clay County, Mississippi
Mississippi placenames of Native American origin